() is the Christmas gift-bringer in modern Danish culture, the equivalent of Father Christmas or Santa Claus.   can be directly translated as "The Yule-Man" or "The Christmas-man".  is often illustrated as a short, bearded man dressed in gray clothes and a red hat. He is said to bring presents on Christmas Eve (December 24), coming to houses either by foot or by sleigh, and often wears fur to keep him warm.

History 

The roots of   reach into Danish folklore and mythology. However, the character is a relatively new phenomenon in Denmark, appearing some time after World War II (1939–1945).

This was achieved by feeding him, traditionally with some form of porridge (now rice porridge).

In popular culture
The gift-giving  that became  seems to have drawn influences from the American Santa, when American culture began making an impact in Denmark, but rather than outright copying him, local traditions were tweaked, eventually resulting in a Father Christmas-type character with only traces of the original  and in some respects indistinguishable from Santa.

In an attempt to attract more than 800,000 tourists, the Tivoli theme park in Copenhagen replaced their  display to that of its Russian counterpart – Father Frost in 2011.

Postal address
In Denmark a special postal address is used by Post Danmark for children who want to write to :
 

 translates as 'Reindeer Way', while the PO Box number 2412 is a reference to 24 December.

References

External links
Santa, our Arctic colleague
Christmas History and Traditions of Different Cultures
Danish Christmas by the Fireside

Christmas in Denmark
Christmas characters
Danish culture
Danish folklore
Santa Claus
Christmas gift-bringers
Yule